Veh-Kavat (also spelled Veh-Kavadh), known in Islamic sources as Bih-Qubadh, was an administrative district within the Sasanian province of Asuristan and is known to have survived the Arab conquest of the Sasanian Empire and existed as a district until the 9th century AD at the least.

It encompassed all of today's cities of Najaf and Kufa in Iraq.

Sources

 

Former populated places in Iraq